The 2022 Rally Japan (also known as the FORUM8 Rally Japan 2022) was a motor racing event for rally cars held over four days between 10 and 13 November 2022. It would mark the seventh running of the Rally Japan. The event would be the final round of the 2022 World Rally Championship, World Rally Championship-2 and World Rally Championship-3.

Sébastien Ogier and Julien Ingrassia are the defending rally winners. However, Ingrassia would not defend his title as he retired from the sport at the end of 2021 season.

Thierry Neuville and Martijn Wydaeghe won their second rally of the season. Their team, Hyundai Shell Mobis WRT, were the manufacturer's winners. Grégoire Munster and Louis Louka won the World Rally Championship-2 category, while Emil Lindholm and Reeta Hämäläinen clinched the WRC-2 titles.

Background

Entry list
The following crews were entered into the rally. The event was open to crews competing in the World Rally Championship, its support categories, the World Rally Championship-2 and World Rally Championship-3, and privateer entries that are not registered to score points in any championship. Eleven were entered under Rally1 regulations, as are seventeen Rally2 crews in the World Rally Championship-2.

Itinerary
All dates and times are JST (UTC+9).

Report

WRC Rally1

Classification

Special stages

Championship standings
Bold text indicates 2022 World Champions.

WRC-2 Rally2

Classification

Special stages

Championship standings
Bold text indicates 2022 World Champions.

WRC-3 Rally3
No Rally3 crews entered the round.

Championship standings
Bold text indicates 2022 World Champions.

References

External links

  
 2022 Rally Japan at eWRC-results.com
 2022 Rally Japan at rally-maps.com 

2022 in Japanese motorsport
2022 World Rally Championship season
November 2022 sports events in Japan
2022